The Metropolitan Archdiocese of Baltimore is the premier (or first) see of the Latin Church of the Catholic Church in the United States. The archdiocese comprises the City of Baltimore and nine of Maryland's 23 counties in the central and western portions of the state: Allegany, Anne Arundel, Baltimore, Carroll, Frederick, Garrett, Harford, Howard, and Washington. The archdiocese is the metropolitan see of the larger regional Ecclesiastical Province of Baltimore. The Archdiocese of Washington was originally part of the Archdiocese of Baltimore.

The Archdiocese of Baltimore is the oldest diocese in the United States whose see city was entirely within the nation's boundaries when the United States declared its independence in 1776. The Holy See granted the archbishop of Baltimore the right of precedence in the nation at liturgies, meetings, and Plenary Councils on August 15, 1859. Although the Archdiocese of Baltimore does not enjoy "primatial" status, it is the premier episcopal see of the Roman Catholic Church in the United States of America, as "prerogative of place".

Within the archdiocese are 518,000 Catholics, 145 parishes, 545 priests (244 diocesan priests, 196 priests resident in diocese), 159 permanent deacons, 55 brothers, 803 sisters, five hospitals, 28 aged homes, 7 diocesan/parish high schools, 13 private high schools, and four Catholic colleges/universities.

The Archdiocese of Baltimore has two major seminaries: St. Mary's Seminary and University in Baltimore and Mount St. Mary's Seminary in Emmitsburg.

This archdiocese was featured in the Netflix documentary The Keepers exposing the sexual abuse history at Archbishop Keough High School and the murder of Sister Catherine Cesnik in 1969. It was revealed in late 2016 that the Archdiocese of Baltimore had paid off numerous settlements since 2011 for abuse victims.

History

Before and during the American Revolutionary War, the Catholics in Great Britain's Thirteen Colonies in America were under the ecclesiastical jurisdiction of the Apostolic Vicariate of the London District in England. After the Treaty of Paris, signed on September 3, 1783, ended the war, Maryland clergy delivered a petition to the Holy See, on November 6, 1783, for permission for the missionaries in the United States to nominate a superior who would have some of the powers of a bishop. In response, Pope Pius VI on June 6, 1784, confirmed Father John Carroll, who had been selected by his brother priests, as Superior of the Missions in the newly independent thirteen United States of North America, with power to give the sacrament of confirmation. This act established a hierarchy in the United States and removed the Catholic Church in the U.S. from the authority of the vicar apostolic of the London District.

Maryland being one of the few regions of the colonial United States with a substantial Roman Catholic population, Pope Pius VI proceeded to erect the Prefecture Apostolic of the United States encompassing the entire territory of the United States, with its see in Baltimore, and appointed Fr. Carroll as the first Prefect Apostolic on November 26, 1784.  The same pope erected the Diocese of Baltimore, the first diocese in the United States, in the territory of the prefecture apostolic on November 6, 1789. In 1790, Father Carroll traveled to England where he was ordained and consecrated as a bishop in Lulworth Castle in Dorset, by Bishop Charles Walmesley, O.S.B. Carroll subsequently ordained the first American-born Catholic priest, William Matthews, at St. Peter's Pro-Cathedral in the Diocese of Baltimore in 1800.

On April 8, 1808, Pope Pius VII erected the Diocese of Boston, the Diocese of New York, the Diocese of Philadelphia, and the Diocese of Bardstown in Bardstown, Kentucky, taking their territory from the Diocese of Baltimore. He simultaneously elevated the Diocese of Baltimore to a metropolitan archdiocese, designating the four new dioceses as its suffragan sees.

The archdiocese continued to lose territory through the 19th century as the church evolved and grew in the United States.

 Pope Pius VII erected of the Diocese of Charleston (encompassing the states of North Carolina, South Carolina, and Georgia) and the Diocese of Richmond (encompassing the state of Virginia except two counties of the Eastern Shore region) on July 11, 1820;, making both dioceses additional suffragans of the Archdiocese of Baltimore.
 Pope Gregory XVI erected the Vicariate Apostolic of the Oregon Territory, taking its territory from the Archdiocese of Baltimore and the Archdiocese of Quebec and making it an additional suffragan of the Archdiocese of Baltimore, on December 1, 1843.
 The federal government having retroceded the city of Alexandria from the District of Columbia to Virginia in 1846, Pope Pius IX transferred that territory from the Archdiocese of Baltimore to the Diocese of Richmond on August 15, 1858.
 Pope Pius IX also erected the Diocese of Wilmington (Delaware), taking the state of Delaware and the Eastern Shore region of Maryland and Virginia from the Archdiocese of Baltimore and making it a suffragan of the same archdiocese, on March 3, 1868.
 On July 22, 1939, Pope Pius XII erected the Archdiocese of Washington, taking the territory of the District of Columbia and Montgomery, Prince George, St. Mary's, Calvert, and Charles Counties from the Archdiocese of Baltimore, and naming the archbishop of Baltimore, Michael J. Curley also the first archbishop of Washington so the two archdioceses remained united  (in the person of the bishop). This action established the current territory of the Archdiocese of Baltimore.  Archbishop Curly used the title of Archbishop of Baltimore-Washington during this period, although the title of the archdiocese never formally changed.  Eight years later, on November 15, 1947, the same pope appointed Patrick A. O'Boyle as the second Archbishop of Washington, thus separating the jurisdictions completely. The Archdiocese of Washington thus became the only archdiocese in the United States that was not also a metropolitan see, and this status endured until Pope Paul VI elevated it to a metropolitan see, designating the Diocese of St. Thomas as its only suffragan, on October 12, 1965.

The Metropolitan Archdiocese of Baltimore was the only metropolitan archdiocese in the United States from its elevation to that status on April 8, 1808, until Pope Pius IX elevated the Diocese of St. Louis to that status on July 20, 1847, so the entire country formed just one ecclesiastical province for most of that period. The same pope elevated the Diocese of Cincinnati, the Diocese of New Orleans, the Diocese of New York, and the Diocese of Oregon City to metropolitan archdioceses, on July 19, 1850, substantially reducing the area of the Metropolitan Province of Baltimore.  As the nation's population grew and waves of Catholic immigrants arrived, the Holy See continued to erect new dioceses and elevate certain others to the status of metropolitan archdioceses, which simultaneously became metropolitan sees of new ecclesiastical provinces. Thus, the Province of Baltimore gradually became smaller, diminishing to the states of Delaware, Virginia, and West Virginia and the counties of Maryland that are not part of the Archdiocese of Washington.  At that time, the province consisted of the Archdiocese of Baltimore, the Diocese of Richmond, the Diocese of Wheeling, and the Diocese of Wilmington.

On May 28, 1974, Pope Paul VI (1) transferred the two counties of the Eastern Shore region of Virginia from the Diocese of Wilmington to the Diocese of Richmond, (2) erected the Diocese of Arlington, taking the northern portion of the state of Virginia from the Diocese of Richmond and making it a suffragan of the Metropolitan Archdiocese of Baltimore, and (3) adjusted the boundary between the Diocese of Richmond and the Diocese of Wheeling, which Pope Pius IX had erected in territory taken from the Diocese of Richmond and made a suffragan of the Archdiocese of Baltimore on July 19, 1850, to conform to the Virginia-West Virginia state line by transferred the territory of the Diocese of Wheeling that was in Virginia to the Diocese of Richmond and the territory of the Diocese of Richmond that was in West Virginia to the Diocese of Wheeling.  A few months later, on August 21, 1974, the same pope changed the title of the Diocese of Wheeling to Diocese of Wheeling-Charleston.  These actions established the present configuration of the Metropolitan Province of Baltimore, which now consists of the Archdiocese of Baltimore and the Diocese of Arlington, the Diocese of Richmond, the Diocese of Wheeling-Charleston, and the Diocese of Wilmington.

The archdiocese began to publish its diocesan newspaper, The Baltimore Catholic Review in 1913 as the successor to the earlier diocesan publication The Catholic Mirror, published 1833 to 1908. The name has since been shortened to The Catholic Review.  It changed from weekly to biweekly publication in 2012 and transformed again to a monthly magazine in December 2015.

Plenary councils of Baltimore
The Plenary Councils of Baltimore were three national meetings of Catholic bishops in the United States in 1852, 1866 and 1884 in Baltimore, Maryland.
 First Plenary Council of Baltimore (1852): among the decrees were one that required immigrant priests to provide a letter of reference from their previous bishops, and a requirement that marriage banns be published.
 Second Plenary Council of Baltimore (1866): promulgated the custom of the Churching of women, the blessing of women after giving birth, focusing on blessing and thanksgiving; and set the age for first communion at ten years of age, as well as, handling other ecclesiastical matters.
 Third Plenary Council of Baltimore (1884): was presided over by Archbishop of Baltimore James Gibbons as Apostolic Delegate. It set six Holy Days of Obligation, and appointed a commission to draft a catechism, and addressed other subjects.

Notable people 

 St. Elizabeth Ann Seton - Seton founded the first American congregation of religious sisters, the Sisters of Charity of St. Joseph, in Emmitsburg, Maryland, in 1809. A year later, she opened the first free Catholic school for girls in the United States. Many trace the modern Catholic school system in America to Seton's Emmitsburg institution. In 1975, Seton became the first American-born person to be canonized a saint.
 Mother Mary Lange - Born in Cuba, Elizabeth Clarisse Lange migrated to United States in the early 19th century. She eventually settled in Baltimore and opened a free school in her home where she educated black children who faced intense prejudice and were denied access to most schools. In 1828, Lange founded the Oblate Sisters of Providence, the first sustained religious order for women of African descent in the United States. She also opened what would later become St. Frances Academy - the first Catholic School for African-American children in the U.S. In 1991, the Catholic Church opened a cause of sainthood for Lange, naming her a "servant of God."

Sexual abuse cases
In 2016, the Archdiocese of Baltimore confirmed that settlements had been paid to past students of Archbishop Keough High School who were sexually abused by Father A. Joseph Maskell, a priest at the school from 1967 to 1975. In January 1970, a popular English and drama teacher at Archbishop Keough, Sister Cathy Cesnik, was found murdered in the outskirts of the city of Baltimore. Her murder was never solved and is the topic of a true crime documentary The Keepers that was released on Netflix on May 19, 2017. Maskell, who died in 2001, was long fingered as a lead suspect in her murder. Though never formally charged, the Archdiocese of Baltimore settled with 16 of Maskell's possible victims for a total of $472,000 by 2017.

A report released by Pennsylvania Attorney General Josh Shapiro on August 14, 2018, singled out bishop and future cardinal William Keeler for transferring abusive Pennsylvania priest Father Arthur Long from the Diocese of Harrisburg to the Archdiocese of Baltimore.  On August 15, 2018, one day after the Pennsylvania report was published, the Archdiocese of Baltimore announced that a pre K-8 Catholic school scheduled to be opened in 2018 and named for Keeler would no longer bear his name.  Despite a denial from Long's religious order and the Archdiocese of Baltimore that Long abused children while serving the Archdiocese of Baltimore, a leaked church memo written in 1995, the year Long was removed from ministry, revealed that accusations of "inappropriate behavior" had surfaced against Long in 1991 and 1992 during his time in the Archdiocese of Baltimore, and the Pennsylvania report noted that Keeler was notified of accusations of Long sexually abusing children when he was serving as Bishop of Harrisburg in 1987. Long died in 2004.

In March 2019, Archbishop Lori banned accused former Archdiocese of Baltimore Auxiliary Bishop Gordon Bennett from practicing any form of ministry in the Archdiocese of Baltimore and the suffragan Diocese of Wheeling–Charleston. In April 2019, the Archdiocese of Baltimore added the names of 23 deceased clergy to a list of accused clergy which the archdiocese published in 2002. Long, a Jesuit, was among those added to the list.

Episcopate

"Prerogative of place"
The Archdiocese of Baltimore is led by the archbishop of Baltimore and a corps of auxiliary bishops who assist in the administration of the archdiocese as part of a larger curia.

In 1858, the Sacred Congregation for the Propagation of the Faith (Propaganda Fide), with the approval of Pope Pius IX, conferred "Prerogative of Place" on the Archdiocese of Baltimore.  This decree gives the archbishop of Baltimore precedence over all other archbishops of the United States (but not cardinals) in councils, gatherings, and meetings of whatever kind of the hierarchy (in conciliis, coetibus et comitiis quibuscumque), regardless of the seniority of other archbishops in promotion or ordination.

Co-cathedrals
The archbishop is concurrently the pastor of the Cathedral of Mary Our Queen in Homeland in north Baltimore (donated by Thomas J O'Neill) and the Basilica of the National Shrine of the Assumption of the Blessed Virgin Mary (old Baltimore Cathedral). The older cathedral is located on Cathedral Hill above downtown, near the Mount Vernon-Belvedere neighborhood. Both are called co-cathedrals. The archbishop appoints a rector for each of the co-cathedrals. The basilica, built in 1806–1821, is the first cathedral constructed in the United States (within its boundaries at the time). It is considered the mother church of the United States. During the time from the first bishop John Carroll's installation in 1790 to the dedication of the old Baltimore Cathedral in 1821, the bishop's throne (cathedra) was at St. Peter's Church (first parish in the diocese, founded 1770). It was located two blocks south on the northwestern corner of North Charles Street and West Saratoga Street, serving as the pro-cathedral with its attached rectory, school and surrounding cemetery. Old St. Peter's was across the street from the "Mother Church of the Anglican Church" in Baltimore, Old St. Paul's Church, with four successive buildings at the site beginning in 1730 at the southeast corner of Charles and Saratoga streets in downtown overlooking the harbor. St. Peter's Roman Catholic parish was razed in 1841.

The Archdiocese of Baltimore is one of only three United States dioceses that have two churches serving as cathedrals in the same city, the others being the Diocese of Honolulu, and the Diocese of Brooklyn. Other dioceses with two cathedrals have them in separate cities.

Bishops

Prefect Apostolic of the United States
 John Carroll (1784–1789), appointed first diocesan bishop with erection of diocese

Bishop of Baltimore
 John Carroll (1789–1808), elevated to Archbishop

Archbishops of Baltimore

 John Carroll (1808–1815)
 Leonard Neale (1815–1817; coadjutor archbishop 1795–1815)
 Ambrose Maréchal (1817–1828)
 James Whitfield (1828–1834; coadjutor archbishop 1828)
 Samuel Eccleston (1834–1851; coadjutor archbishop 1834)
 Francis Patrick Kenrick (1851–1863)
 Martin John Spalding (1864–1872)
 James Roosevelt Bayley (1872–1877)
 James Gibbons (1877–1921) (Cardinal in 1886)
 Michael Joseph Curley (1921–1947)
 Francis Patrick Keough (1947–1961)
 Lawrence Shehan (1961–1974; coadjutor archbishop 1961) (Cardinal in 1965)
 William Donald Borders (1974–1989) 
 William Henry Keeler (1989–2007) (Cardinal in 1994)
 Edwin Frederick O'Brien (2007–2011), appointed Grand Master of the Equestrian Order of the Holy Sepulchre (Cardinal in 2012)
 William Edward Lori (2012–present)

Current auxiliary bishops
 Adam J. Parker (2017–present)
 Bruce Lewandowski (2020–present)

Former auxiliary bishops
 Alfred Allen Paul Curtis (1897–1908), previously appointed Bishop of Wilmington
 Owen Patrick Bernard Corrigan (1908–1929)
 Thomas Joseph Shahan (1914–1932)
 John Michael McNamara (1927–1947), appointed Auxiliary Bishop of Washington
 Lawrence Joseph Shehan (1945–1953), appointed Bishop of Bridgeport; later returned as Coadjutor Archbishop of Baltimore and succeeded to see (see "Archbishops" above); future Cardinal
 Jerome Aloysius Daugherty Sebastian (1953–1960)
 Thomas Austin Murphy (1962–1984) 
 Thomas Joseph Mardaga (1966–1968), appointed Bishop of Wilmington
 Francis Joseph Gossman (1968–1975), appointed Bishop of Raleigh
 Philip Francis Murphy (1976–1999)
 James Francis Stafford (1976–1982), appointed Bishop of Memphis and later Archbishop of Denver, President of the Pontifical Council for the Laity, and Major Penitentiary of the Apostolic Penitentiary (elevated to Cardinal in 1998)
 William Clifford Newman (1984–2003)
 John Ricard (1984–1997), appointed Bishop of Pensacola-Tallahassee
 Gordon Dunlap Bennett (1997–2004), appointed Bishop of Mandeville
 William Francis Malooly (2000–2008), appointed Bishop of Wilmington
 Mitchell T. Rozanski (2004–2014), appointed Bishop of Springfield in Massachusetts
 Denis J. Madden (2005–2016)
 Mark E. Brennan (2017–2019), appointed Bishop of Wheeling-Charleston

Other priests of this diocese who became bishops
 John J. Chanche, P.S.S., appointed Bishop of Natchez in 1841
 Ignatius A. Reynolds, appointed Bishop of Charleston in 1843
 Henry B. Coskery, appointed Bishop of Portland in 1853; did not take effect
 William Henry Elder, appointed Bishop of Natchez in 1857 and Archbishop of Cincinnati in 1883
 Thomas Albert Andrew Becker, appointed Bishop of Wilmington in 1868 and Bishop of Savannah in 1886
 Thomas Patrick Roger Foley, appointed Coadjutor Bishop of Chicago in 1870
 John Joseph Keane, appointed Bishop of Richmond in 1878, rector of The Catholic University of America in 1886, and Archbishop of Dubuque in 1900
 Mark Stanislaus Gross, appointed vicar apostolic of North Carolina in 1880; resigned the episcopate c. 1881
 Jeremiah O'Sullivan, appointed Bishop of Mobile in 1885
 John Samuel Foley, appointed Bishop of Detroit in 1888
 Placide Louis Chapelle, appointed Coadjutor Archbishop of Santa Fe in 1891 (succeeded to that see in 1894), Archbishop of New Orleans in 1897 and Apostolic Delegate to Cuba and Extraordinary Envoy to Puerto Rico and the Philippines in 1898
 Patrick James Donahue, appointed Bishop of Wheeling in 1894
 William Thomas Russell, appointed Bishop of Charleston in 1916
 William Joseph Hafey, appointed Bishop of Raleigh in 1925 and Bishop of Scranton in 1938
 Thomas Joseph Toolen, appointed Bishop of Mobile in 1927
 Peter Leo Ireton, appointed Coadjutor Bishop of Richmond in 1935 and Bishop of Richmond in 1945
 John Joyce Russell, appointed Bishop of Charleston in 1950 and later Bishop of Richmond in 1958
 Philip Matthew Hannan (priest of this archdiocese, 1939-1947), appointed Auxiliary Bishop of Washington in 1956 and Archbishop of New Orleans in 1965
 Michael William Hyle, appointed Coadjutor Bishop of Wilmington in 1958 (succeeded to that see in 1960)
 John Selby Spence (priest of this archdiocese, 1933-1947), appointed auxiliary bishop of Washington in 1964
 Edward John Herrmann (priest of this archdiocese, 1947), appointed auxiliary bishop of Washington in 1966 and Bishop of Columbus in 1973
 Victor Benito Galeone, appointed Bishop of Saint Augustine in 2001
 F. Richard Spencer, appointed Auxiliary Bishop for the Military Services, USA in 2010

Priests appointed, but never ordained, as bishops
Dominic Laurence Grässel appointed Coadjutor Archbishop of Baltimore in 1793 but the notice arrived after his death

Education

High schools

 Archbishop Curley High School, Baltimore
 Archbishop Spalding High School, Severn
 Bishop Walsh School, Cumberland
 Calvert Hall College (high school), Baltimore / Towson
 Cristo Rey Jesuit High School, Baltimore
 Loyola Blakefield, (formerly Loyola High School), Baltimore / Towson
 Maryvale Preparatory School, Brooklandville
 Mercy High School, Baltimore
 Mount de Sales Academy, Baltimore / Catonsville
 Mount Saint Joseph College (high school), Baltimore / Irvington
 Notre Dame Preparatory School, Baltimore / Towson
 Our Lady of Mount Carmel High School, Baltimore
 Our Lady of the Rosary High School, Baltimore
 St. Frances Academy, Baltimore
 St. John's Catholic Preparatory, Buckeystown/ Frederick County (formerly St. John's Literary Institution, Frederick city),
 St. Maria Goretti High School, Hagerstown,
 St. Mary's High School, Annapolis
 The Catholic High School of Baltimore, Baltimore
 The John Carroll School, Bel Air

Churches

Basilica of the National Shrine of the Assumption of the Blessed Virgin Mary (old Baltimore Cathedral / Cathedral of the Assumption of Mary), Baltimore, Maryland
Basilica of the National Shrine of St. Elizabeth Ann Seton, Emmitsburg, Maryland

Ecclesiastical province

Diocese of Arlington
Diocese of Richmond
Diocese of Wheeling-Charleston
Diocese of Wilmington

See also

 Historical list of the Catholic bishops of the United States
 List of the Catholic dioceses of the United States
 List of Roman Catholic archdioceses (by country and continent)
 List of Roman Catholic dioceses (alphabetical) (including archdioceses)
 List of Roman Catholic dioceses (structured view) (including archdioceses)

References

External links

 

 
Baltimore
Christianity in Baltimore
 
Catholic Church in Maryland
Baltimore
Religious organizations established in 1789
1789 establishments in Maryland